Guillermo Armando Orozco Valera  (born 31 January 1958) is a Cuban former hammer thrower who competed in the 1980 Summer Olympics.

His personal best in the event is 74.74 metres.

International competitions

1Representing the Americas

References

1958 births
Living people
Cuban male hammer throwers
Olympic athletes of Cuba
Athletes (track and field) at the 1980 Summer Olympics
Athletes (track and field) at the 1979 Pan American Games
Pan American Games silver medalists for Cuba
Pan American Games medalists in athletics (track and field)
Central American and Caribbean Games gold medalists for Cuba
Competitors at the 1978 Central American and Caribbean Games
Central American and Caribbean Games medalists in athletics
Medalists at the 1979 Pan American Games
20th-century Cuban people